James Wallace was a Scottish professional footballer who played as an inside forward. He played in the English Football League for Burnley and in the Scottish League for Hibernian.

References 

James Wallace, www.ihibs.co.uk

Sportspeople from East Dunbartonshire
Scottish footballers
Association football inside forwards
Burnley F.C. players
Clyde F.C. players
Chester City F.C. players
Hibernian F.C. players
English Football League players
Year of birth missing
Year of death missing
Scottish Football League players